The Doc Alliance is a creative partnership of seven European documentary film festivals, including: CPH:DOX in Copenhagen; Doclisboa; Docs Against Gravity FF; DOK Leipzig; Marseille Festival of Documentary Film; Jihlava International Documentary Film Festival; and Visions du Réel Nyon. The organisation is based in Prague and was founded in 2008, with the aim of promoting the documentary genre. It is financially supported by the European Union's Creative Europe programme, Czech Filmfund and the Czech Ministry of Culture. Its slogan is "the New Deal for Feature Documentaries".

Distribution platform 
The main project of the Doc Alliance is DAFilms.com, an online distribution platform for documentary and experimental films focused on European cinema, which hosts around 1700 films for streaming or download. The films include archive historical films and works by international filmmakers such as Ulrich Seidl, Jorgen Leth, and Chris Marker.

Doc Alliance Award 
The organisations also presents an annual award for the Best European Documentary Feature Film. Each of the participating festivals nominates one film for the shortlist. The competition films are primarily creative documentary debuts by emerging filmmakers. The festivals also nominate representatives to the jury of experts, chosen from film critics from the festival countries. Since 2015 the award has been presented at an official ceremony at the Locarno Film Festival. As well as a commemorative plaque, the film director also receives a prize of 5,000 Euro to support their further projects.

2015

 Winner: Homeland (Iraq Year Zero) – director: Abbas Fahdel
 Walking Under Water – director: Eliza Kubarska
 Stranded in Canton – director: Måns Månsson
 Illusion – director: Sofia Marques
 I Am the People – director: Anna Roussillon
 Haunted - director: Liwaa Yazji
 All Things Ablaze – directors: Oleksandr Techynskyi, Aleksey Solodunov, Dmitry Stoykov

2016 

 Winner: Gulîstan, Land of Roses – director: Zaynê Akyol
 Jarocin - The Rise of Freedom - director: Lech Gnoinski, Marek Gajczak
 Fragment 53 – director: Carlo Gabriele Tribbioli
 Maybe Desert, Perhaps Universe - director: Miguel Seabra Lopes]], Karen Akerman
 Steam on the River - director: Filip Remunda, Robert Kirchhoff
 Maestà, the Passion of Christ – director: Andy Guérif
 Train to Adulthood – director: Klára Trencsényi

2017 

 Winner: Taste of Cement – director: Ziad Kalthoum
 95 and 6 to Go - director: Kimi Takesue
 Convictions - director: Tatyana Chistova
 Childhood - director: Margreth Olin
 Spectres Are Haunting Europe - director: Maria Kourkouta, Niki Giannari
 Those Shocking Shaking Days - director: Selma Doborac
 When Will This Wind Stop - director: Aniela Astrid Gabryel

 2018 

 Winner: Srbenka''' - Director: Nebojša Slijepčević
 Doel - Director: Frederik Sølberg
 Granny Project - Director: Bálint Révész
 The Limits of Work - Director: Apolena Rychlíková
 Inside - Director: Camila Rodríguez Triana
 Instant Dreams - Director: Willem Baptist
 Southern Belle - Directed by: Nicolas Peduzzi

 2021 A Black Jesus - Director: Lucca LucchesiThe Blunder of Love - Director: Rocco Di MentoGabi, Between Ages of 8-13 - Director: Engeli BrobergLooking for Horses - Director: Stefan PavlovićNative Rock - Director: Macià Florit CampinsTraces of a Landsacpe - Director: Petr ZárubaZaho Zay'' - Directed by: Maéva Ranaïvojaona, Georg Tiller

References 

Documentary film organizations
Organizations based in Prague
Organizations established in 2008
2008 establishments in Europe